The Herried House, also known as Grow House, is a historic house at 4400 North Palmer-Fishook Road, near Palmer, Alaska.  It is a -story log structure, built from pre-cut logs that were assembled on site.  The walls are three-sided logs, notched at the corners, with the gaps filled by burlap and caulking.  To the west side of the main block is a wood-frame garage which has log siding.  The house was built in 1935 by the Works Progress Administration as part of the Matanuska Valley Colony, and is one of its best-preserved survivors.  The first owners, Leonard and Ellie Herried, lived there 1935–38.

The house was listed on the National Register of Historic Places in 1991.

See also
National Register of Historic Places listings in Matanuska-Susitna Borough, Alaska

References

1935 establishments in Alaska
Agricultural buildings and structures on the National Register of Historic Places in Alaska
Houses completed in 1935
Houses in Matanuska-Susitna Borough, Alaska
Houses on the National Register of Historic Places in Alaska
Buildings and structures on the National Register of Historic Places in Matanuska-Susitna Borough, Alaska
Works Progress Administration in Alaska